Jessica McCormack (born 8 September 1989 in Hamilton, New Zealand) is a women's basketball and netball player. At the 2006 Commonwealth Games she won a silver medal as part of the Tall Ferns New Zealand women's basketball team. McCormack represented New Zealand in basketball again at the 2008 Summer Olympics in Beijing.

McCormack played college basketball in the United States for the University of Washington and the University of Connecticut. In 2009, she returned to New Zealand in 2009 for surgery on an Achilles tendon injury. That year, McCormack was also signed for the Netball New Zealand Accelerant Group, a development squad for potential players in the New Zealand netball team, the Silver Ferns. She later signed with the Canberra Capitals in the Australian WNBL.

References

1989 births
Living people
Sportspeople from Hamilton, New Zealand
New Zealand women's basketball players
New Zealand netball players
Basketball players at the 2006 Commonwealth Games
Commonwealth Games silver medallists for New Zealand
Olympic basketball players of New Zealand
Basketball players at the 2008 Summer Olympics
Canberra Capitals players
Commonwealth Games medallists in basketball
Medallists at the 2006 Commonwealth Games